Lucky Four is an album by David Murray released on the Tutu label. It was recorded in 1988, released in 1989, and features eight quartet performances by Murray with Wilber Morris, Dave Burrell and Victor Lewis.

Reception
The Allmusic review by Brian Olewnick awarded the album 4 stars, stating: "The late '80s produced some of Murray's strongest work in the quartet format, and Lucky Four fits in quite comfortably. Recommended."

Track listing
 "Valley Talk" (Burrell) - 5:31  
 "Chazz (For Charles Mingus)" (Morris) - 8:52  
 "As I Woke" (Morris) - 6:41  
 "Strollin' (For Jean Michel Basquiat)" (Mwanga) - 2:51  
 "Abel's Blissed Out Blues" (Burrell) - 10:34  
 "Sharing" (Morris) - 12:23  
 "As I Woke" [2nd Version]  (Morris) - 8:01  
 "Valley Talk" [2nd Version] (Burrell) - 5:28  
Recorded September 25, 1988 at Trixi Studio, Munich

Personnel
David Murray - tenor saxophone
Dave Burrell - piano
Wilber Morris - bass
Victor Lewis - drums

References 

1989 albums
David Murray (saxophonist) albums